Giuseppe Patania (January 18, 1780 – February 23, 1852) was an Italian painter of the Neoclassical period. He painted portraits and historical subjects.

Biography
He was born in Palermo, Sicily. He studied with Giuseppe Velasco and Vincenzo Riolo. He is buried in San Domenico in Palermo, where his tomb states Selected the beautiful from Nature. Among his pupils were Pietro Marchese di Castrogiovanni, Giuseppe Bagnasco, Francesco Sacco, Giuseppe Carta, Andrea D'Antoni and Pietro Volpes.

In his biography of Andrea D'Antoni, the author Carmelo Pardi surveyed the art of the early prior century in Palermo, and observed that it was dominated by Velasco (Velasques), Riolo, and Patania. While all three gained local eminence, none had all the required skills to form a true school of followers: Velasques, master of design but poor colorist; Riolo, while Michelagelesque in his grand paintings, restricted himself to academic subjects and molded many of his images in imitation of classic statuary; while Patania, full of natural instincts, completed genre works with delicate grace, but failed in large compositions depicting great and severe arguments. Thus to summarize: in Velasquez, the perfection of design surpassed the color; in Riolo the conventionality of the form prevailed to the study of the true, and in the Patania the natural spontaneity took precedence to the knowledge of the principles that inform art.

Gallery

References

1811 births
1868 deaths
Painters from Palermo
18th-century Italian painters
Italian male painters
19th-century Italian painters
Burials at San Domenico, Palermo
Italian neoclassical painters
19th-century Italian male artists
18th-century Italian male artists